Đorđe M. Pavlović (1838 – 1921) was a Serbian politician, university professor, judge and academic.

He graduated law at the University of Paris in 1862 and returned to the Principality of Serbia to teach law at Belgrade's Grande école (Velika škola) from 1864 until 1871. Pavlović was co-founded the Credit Bank of Smederevo and later served as President of Serbia's Court of Cassation and Government Minister in several terms. King Milan Obrenović awarded him the Order of the Cross of Takovo.

Selected works
Hipotekarno pravo u Kneževini Srbiji
O obaveznostima i ugovorima uopšte
Objašnjenje građanskog zakona o jamstvu

References

1838 births
1921 deaths
Serbian politicians
Academic staff of Belgrade Higher School
Foreign ministers of Serbia
Finance ministers of Serbia